James Dudley Elliott is a Judge of the Supreme Court of Victoria and sits as a judge of the Commercial Court. He was admitted to practice in 1988 after completing articles with Baker & McKenzie, signing the Bar Roll in 1990 and becoming Senior Counsel in 2004. He was appointed to the Trial Division of the Supreme Court on 26 March 2013.

References

Living people
Judges of the Supreme Court of Victoria
Year of birth missing (living people)
People associated with Baker McKenzie